Hinds County is a county located in the U.S. state of Mississippi. With its county seats (Raymond and the state's capital, Jackson), Hinds is the most populous county in Mississippi with a 2020 census population of 227,742 residents. Hinds County is a central part of the Jackson metropolitan statistical area. It is a professional, educational, business and industrial hub in the state. It is bordered on the northwest by the Big Black River and on the east by the Pearl River. It is one county width away from the Yazoo River and the southern border of the Mississippi Delta.

In the 19th century, the rural areas of the county were devoted to cotton plantations worked by enslaved African Americans and depended on agriculture well into the 20th century; from 1877 to 1950, this county had 22 lynchings, the highest number in the state. Mississippi has the highest total number of lynchings of any state.

In Sept 2022, it was reported that Hinds County, Mississippi, had the highest STD rate in the United States, with 2,253 cases per 100,000 residents.

Etymology 
The county is named for General Thomas Hinds, a hero of the Battle of New Orleans during the War of 1812.

Geography
It is the third-largest county in Mississippi by land area and fifth-largest by total area.

Adjacent counties
 Madison County (northeast)
 Rankin County (east)
 Copiah County (south)
 Claiborne County (southwest)
 Warren County (west)
 Yazoo County (northwest)

National protected area
 Natchez Trace Parkway (part)

Transportation

Major highways

Airports
The following public-use airports are located in Hinds County:
 Hawkins Field (HKS) in Jackson
 John Bell Williams Airport (JVW) in Raymond

Demographics

With a population of 8,645 at the 1830 United States census, the county's population has experienced growth to an initial historic high of 250,000 in 1980; its second historic high was 254,441 at the 1990 census. Since then, its population has fluctuated to 250,800 in 2000 and 245,285 in 2010. At the 2020 census, its population was 227,742, locally reflecting a drop in the state's overall population.

Race and ethnicity

With the trend of greater diversification in the United States leading up to and following the 2020 census, the county and state's population declined with non-Hispanic whites and overall; for contrast, in 2010, non-Hispanic whites made up 28.4% of the population, yet in 2020 they declined to 25.5% of the population. Historic minorities in the county and state increased in population. The 2020 census reported 69.2% of its population was Black or African American, 0.2% Native American, 1.0% Asian, nil% Pacific Islander, 2.3% of two or more races, and 2.0% Hispanic or Latino of any race.

Law enforcement

The Hinds County Sheriffs Department provides police services to areas of the county that are unincorporated or in municipalities that do not have their own local police force. It was founded on January 1, 1928.

Tyrone Lewis took office January 3, 2012, taking over from Malcolm E. McMillin who had held the role for 20 years. Victor Mason defeated Tyrone Lewis August 4, 2015 as Lewis sought another term. Mason went on to secure the Office November 3, 2015. Mason defeated 3 other candidates securing more than seventy percent of the vote. Victor Mason was defeated in the Democratic Primary on August 27, 2019, by Lee D. Vance. On August 4, 2021, Sheriff Lee Vance was found deceased at his home after contracting COVID-19. The current sheriff is Tyree Jones, elected November 23, 2021.

Government
Hinds County is governed via a five-member board of supervisors, each elected from single-member districts. The county is led by a county administrator, who is appointed.

The Mississippi Department of Human Services (MDHS) has its headquarters in Jackson and in Hinds County. The Division of Youth Services operates the Oakley Training School (OTS) in an unincorporated area of Hinds County.

The Mississippi Department of Corrections has its headquarters in Jackson and in Hinds County. It operates the Jackson Probation & Parole Office in the city.

Education

Public schools
School districts:
 Clinton Public School District
 Hinds County School District (Raymond)
 Jackson Public School District

State-operated schools:
 Mississippi School for the Blind
 Mississippi School for the Deaf

Private schools
 Clinton Christian Academy (Clinton)
 Hillcrest Christian School (Jackson)
 Jackson Academy (Jackson)
 Mt. Salus Christian School (Clinton)
 Rebul Academy (Learned)
 Central Hinds Academy(Raymond)

Colleges and universities
 Belhaven University (Jackson)
 Hinds Community College (Raymond)
 Jackson State University (Jackson)
 Millsaps College (Jackson)
 Mississippi College (Clinton)
 Mississippi College School of Law (Jackson)
 Reformed Theological Seminary (Jackson)
 Tougaloo College (Tougaloo)
 University of Mississippi Medical Center (Jackson)
 Wesley Biblical Seminary (Jackson)

Public libraries
 Jackson/Hinds Library System

Communities

Cities
 Byram
 Clinton
 Jackson (county seat; partly in Madison and Rankin counties)
 Raymond (county seat)

Towns
 Bolton
 Edwards
 Learned
 Terry
 Utica

Unincorporated communities
 Brownsville
 Cayuga
 Cynthia
 Dabney Crossroads
 Midway
 Oakley
 Pocahontas

Notable people
 Kate Stone (1841–1907), diarist
 Henry Sloan (1870–1948), delta blues musician
 Charley Patton (1891–1934), blues musician
 Richard Durham (1917–1984), writer of the radio series Destination Freedom

See also

 National Register of Historic Places listings in Hinds County, Mississippi

References

External links
 Hinds County – Official site.

 
1821 establishments in Mississippi
Jackson metropolitan area, Mississippi
Mississippi counties
Populated places established in 1821
Black Belt (U.S. region)
Majority-minority counties in Mississippi